Cecil Moore (born 1 November 1929) was a Guyanese weightlifter. He competed in the men's light heavyweight event at the 1952 Summer Olympics.

References

External links
 

1929 births
Possibly living people
Guyanese male weightlifters
Olympic weightlifters of British Guiana
Weightlifters at the 1952 Summer Olympics
Place of birth missing